Sonarpur Dakshin Assembly constituency is a Legislative Assembly constituency of South 24 Parganas district in the Indian State of West Bengal.

Overview
As per order of the Delimitation Commission in respect of the Delimitation of constituencies in the West Bengal, Sonarpur Dakshin Assembly constituency is composed of the following:
 Ward No. 8 to Ward No. 26 of Rajpur Sonarpur Municipality
 Kalikapur I, Kalikapur II, Langalberia, Polghat, Protapnagar and Sonarpur II gram panchayats of Sonarpur community development block

Sonarpur Dakshin Assembly constituency is a part of No. 22 Jadavpur (Lok Sabha constituency).

Members of Legislative Assembly

Election results

2021

Legislative Assembly Election 2016

Legislative Assembly Election 2011

Legislative Assembly Elections 1977-2006
In 2006 Shyamal Naskar of CPI(M) won the Sonarpur Assembly constituency defeating his nearest rival Nirmal Chandra Mondal of AITC. In 2001, Nirmal Chandra Mondal of AITC defeated Abha Mondal of CPI(M). Bhadreswar Mondal of CPI(M) defeated Nirmal Chandra Mondal of INC in 1996 and 1991, and Sovaranjan Sardar of INC in 1987. Gangadhar Naskar of CPI(M) defeated Ramkanta Mondal of ICS in 1982 and Gourhari Sardar of INC in 1977.

Legislative Assembly Elections 1962-1972
Kansari Halder of CPI won in 1972. Gangadhar Naskar of CPI(M) won in 1971, 1969, and 1967. Khagendra Kumar Roy Choudhury of CPI won in 1962.

References

Notes

Citations

Assembly constituencies of West Bengal
Politics of South 24 Parganas district